The Belarus national futsal team is the national futsal team of Belarus and is controlled by the Football Federation of Belarus and represents the country in international futsal competitions, such as the FIFA Futsal World Cup and the European Championships.

Tournament records

FIFA Futsal World Cup

UEFA European Futsal Championship

Current squad
The following players were named for 2020 FIFA Futsal World Cup

References

External links
 Official website

Belarus
Futsal
Futsal in Belarus